Roman Špirelja (born 31 January 1973) is a Croatian sports shooter. He competed at the 1996 Summer Olympics and the 2000 Summer Olympics.

References

1973 births
Living people
Croatian male sport shooters
Olympic shooters of Croatia
Shooters at the 1996 Summer Olympics
Shooters at the 2000 Summer Olympics
Sportspeople from Zagreb